Jeunesse Sportive d'El Biar, referred to commonly as JS El Biar or JSEB for short, is an Algerian football club based in the El Biar district of Alger, Algeria. Founded in 1944, the team currently plays in the Régionale I in the Ligue Régionale d'Alger, the fourth tier of Algerian football. Founded by a group of friends.

Notable players
  Ali Djema
  Djamel Amani
  Zoubir Bachi
  Nassim Bounekdja
  Bouzid Mahyouz
  Abdelhak Benchikha
  Mahmoud Guendouz
  Mohamed Hamdoud
  Tarek Lazizi
  Djamel Menad
  Fawzi Moussouni
  Lahcène Nazef
  Rabah Saâdane
  Abderrahmane Soukhane

References

External links

Football clubs in Algeria
Association football clubs established in 1944
Football clubs in Algiers
1944 establishments in Algeria